Robert Caesar Childers (12 February 1838 – 25 July 1876) was a British Orientalist scholar, compiler of the first Pāli-English dictionary. Childers was the husband of Anna Barton of Ireland. He was the father of Irish nationalist Erskine Childers and grandfather to the fourth President of Ireland, Erskine Hamilton Childers.

Early life and marriage
He was born in Nice, Piedmont-Sardinia, the son of Canon Charles Childers, chaplain to the English colony in Nice. His grandmother was Selina Eardley. In 1857, at the age of nineteen, he began the study of Hebrew at Wadham College, Oxford, graduating in 1861. After some travels in Ireland, he soon married Anna Barton of Glendalough House. The Bartons of Wicklow, Ireland, were a very wealthy and respected family in Irish farming and politics.

Pali dictionary

He then moved to Ceylon for an official position in the civil service. During this period he studied Sinhalese culture, particularly the Pali language. In 1869 he published the first Pali text in Britain, and began to work on a Pali dictionary, which was published 1872–75.

In 1872 he was appointed sub-librarian at the India Office, and in the following year he became the first professor of Pali and Buddhist literature at University College, London.

In 1876 Childers' dictionary was awarded the Volney Prize by the Institute of France. He died at the age of 38 in London the same year, apparently having succumbed to tuberculosis which had been troubling him for many years, and which grew worse after Childers contracted a cold in the early part of the year. He is buried with his wife Anna on the western side of Highgate Cemetery, London.

References

Sources

http://www.ames.cam.ac.uk/faclib/archive/rhys-index.html Rhys Davids Archives at Cambridge. Letters from Childers.
http://dsal.uchicago.edu/dictionaries/pali/frontmatter.html
http://www.quangduc.com/English/revival.htm
https://www.buddhismtoday.com/english/world/country/001-india.htm
 
VII. Professor Robert Caesar Childers, a chapter of "From the Living Fountains of Buddhism" by Ananda W. P. Guruge

1838 births
1876 deaths
British Indologists
Pali
Irish Buddhists
Robert Caesar
English people of Portuguese-Jewish descent
British scholars of Buddhism
Alumni of Wadham College, Oxford
Academics of University College London
Burials at Highgate Cemetery